Géza Kövesdi (1887 – 1950) was a Hungarian athlete. He competed in the men's long jump at the 1908 Summer Olympics.

References

1887 births
1950 deaths
Athletes (track and field) at the 1908 Summer Olympics
Hungarian male long jumpers
Olympic athletes of Hungary
Athletes from Budapest